Club Sandwich at the Peveril Hotel was the final release by Six by Seven, made after the group disbanded. Following the split in late 2005, 3 original members of the band (Chris Olley, James Flower and Chris Davis) formed a new band (tentatively called 'Collision') with two additional members (Ady Fletcher and Tony 'Doggen' Foster), with the hope of developing a new sound. Understandably, the sessions ended up sounding like Six by Seven, and so the recordings were released under that moniker.

Track listing
 "Intro and Theme Tune" – 5:08
 "Got to Find a Way Out of Here" – 5:18
 "Do You Believe?" – 5:21
 "America" – 4:05
 "Sailing Around the Horn" – 4:26
 "I'm Gonna Try" – 5:13
 "In My Hell" – 6:28
 "Don't Wanna Dance" – 4:27
 "In a Hole" – 4:17
 "25 Years" – 5:21
 "How Does It Feel" – 5:12
 "Don't Let It Bring You Down" – 5:06

Six by Seven albums
2006 albums